The Kenong is a musical instrument of Indonesia used in the gamelan. It is a kind of gong and is placed on its side. It has the same length and width. Thus, it is similar to the bonang, kempyang, and ketuk, which are also cradled gongs. Kenongs are generally much larger than the aforementioned instruments. However, the kenong has a considerably higher pitch. Its sound stands out because of its unique timbre. The kenong sticks are taller than that of the bonang. The kenong is sometimes played by the same player as the kempyang and ketuk.

Most of the instruments in the gamelan 'family'. are originally from Java, Indonesia but spread to Southeast Asia.

The kenong usually has a specific part in the colotomic structure of the gamelan, marking off parts of a structure smaller than a gongan (the space between each strike of the gong). In a fast, short structure these can only last a second or so; in a longer gendhing, particularly in a slow irama, they can last several minutes. There are usually two or four  in a gongan.

Kenongs are usually in sets of one for each note, although sometimes other notes can be substituted for any missing notes. A full gamelan would include sets for slendro and pelog. The boxes (rancak) for the kenong are usually for one or two; these are then put in a line or curve surrounding the player. There are generally more of them than there are kempuls, as all gamelan structures require kenong but not necessarily kempul.

See also

 Gamelan
 Bonang
 Kempul
 Kempyang
 Music of Indonesia
 Music of Java

External links
NIU page on the kenong

Colotomic instruments
Gongs
Indonesian musical instruments